"I Wish You Well" is the first single released from Canadian singer Tom Cochrane's third solo studio album, Ragged Ass Road (1995). Inspired by Cochrane's experiences during the years following the success of his album Mad Mad World, the song was released in 1995 as his first single since "Bigger Man" in 1992. It became only the second song—and the first by a Canadian artist—to debut atop the Canadian RPM Top Singles chart, giving Cochrane his second number-one single in his home country, and it also reached number three on the RPM Adult Contemporary chart. Outside Canada, "I Wish You Well" found fleeting chart success in the United Kingdom and the United States.

Background
"I Wish You Well" was written by Tom Cochrane, inspired by the turmoil he experienced after the success of Mad Mad World and the touring to support the album. Described by Cochrane as "a blur", this period left his home life in a state of disorder, including a year in which he separated with his wife, Kathleen. According to Cochrane, "I Wish You Well" and Ragged Ass Road addresses these issues and what he learned from the period. Along with the rest of the album, Cochrane recorded the song at Metalworks Studios in Mississauga, Ontario, and Ragged Ass Road Studio in early 1995.

Release and chart performance
Released as a single in 1995, "I Wish You Well" debuted at number one on the Canadian RPM Top Singles chart on September 4, 1995, becoming the second song in the chart's history to accomplish this feat (not counting the magazine's first number one), after Band Aid's "Do They Know It's Christmas?" in 1985. It was also the first song by a Canadian artist to debut at number one. The single stayed at the summit for another week, then dropped to number seven on September 18. It stayed in the top 100 for 26 weeks, last appearing at number 98 on February 26, 1996. It was the fourth most successful single of 1995 in Canada, and it also peaked at number three on the RPM Adult Contemporary chart on October 9, 1995.

The song did not make a substantial commercial impact outside Canada, charting only in the United Kingdom and the United States. In the latter country, it peaked at number one on the Billboard Bubbling Under Hot 100 on November 18, 1995. In the United Kingdom, the song was released on October 9, 1995. The track debuted and peaked at number 93 on the UK Singles Chart on October 15, 1995, then left the top 100 the next week.

Track listings

Canadian promotional CD single
 "I Wish You Well" – 4:24
 "Life Is a Highway" – 4:24

Dutch CD single
 "I Wish You Well" – 4:24
 "White Hot" (live) – 6:22

Dutch CD maxi-single
 "I Wish You Well" – 4:24
 "Ragged Ass Road" – 4:45
 "White Hot" (live) – 6:22
 "Lunatic Fringe" (live) – 4:28

UK CD1
 "I Wish You Well"
 "Ragged Ass Road"
 "Life Is a Highway"
 "White Hot" (live)

UK CD2
 "I Wish You Well"
 "Best Waste of Time"
 "Sinking Like a Sunset"
 "Lunatic Fringe" (live)

Credits and personnel
Credits are taken from the UK CD1 liner notes and the Ragged Ass Road album booklet.

Studios
 Recorded in early 1995 at Metalworks Studios (Mississauga, Ontario, Canada) and Ragged Ass Road Studio
 Mixed at Encore Studio (Burbank, California, US)

Personnel
 Tom Cochrane – writing, vocals, acoustic guitars, electric guitars, harmonica, production
 Bill Bell – acoustic guitars, electric guitars
 Ken "Spider" Sinnaeve – bass
 Gregor Beresford – drums, percussion
 John Webster – production, engineering
 Ed Krautner – secondary engineering, additional recording
 Tom Lord-Alge – mixing

Charts

Weekly charts

Year-end charts

Release history

References

Tom Cochrane songs
1995 singles
1995 songs
Capitol Records singles
EMI Records singles
RPM Top Singles number-one singles
Songs written by Tom Cochrane